The discography of Myriam, consist of 8 studio albums, 1 Special Edition, 2 album Compilation, 1 EP, ten singles, and two music videos.

Albums

Studio albums

Compilation albums

EPs

DVDs

Singles

Music videos

References

Discographies of Mexican artists
Latin pop music discographies